Oleksandr Lakusta (born August 8, 1991) is a Ukrainian footballer playing with Toronto Falcons in the Canadian Soccer League.

Club career

Ukraine 
Lakusta played at the youth level with FSC Bukovyna Chernivtsi. He transitioned into the senior team in 2008 where he played for two seasons in the Ukrainian Second League. In 2012, he departed from Bukovyna in order to sign with Nyva Ternopil. He would appear in 27 matches and scored 4 goals in his debut season with Ternopil. After a single season with the club, he was released from his contract.  

Lakusta was linked to a possible return to his former club Bukovyna where he ultimately rejected the offer. He instead secured a deal with Dynamo Khmelnytskyi and would remain in the third tier. Following his brief stint with Dynamo, he returned to his former club Bukovyna for the 204-15 season in the Ukrainian First League. In his debut season in the second tier, he appeared in 3 matches. 

He returned to the third tier the next season to sign with Veres Rivne. Lakusta had another run in the second tier the following season with Mykolaiv. In his second stint in the league, he appeared in 6 matches. After the conclusion of the season, he mutually departed from Mykolaiv.

Canada 
He went abroad in the summer of 2017, to play in the Canadian Soccer League with FC Vorkuta. In his debut season with Vorkuta, he assisted the club in securing the First Division title. In the postseason the club was eliminated in the second round by Scarborough SC. Lakusta re-signed with the club for the 2018 season. Once more he aided the team in securing a playoff berth by finishing second in the division. In the postseason, Vorkuta successfully secured the CSL Championship by defeating Scarborough in a penalty shootout.

In 2022, he signed with the expansion franchise Toronto Falcons.

References 

1991 births
Living people
Ukrainian footballers
FC Bukovyna Chernivtsi players
FC Nyva Ternopil players
FC Dynamo Khmelnytskyi players
NK Veres Rivne players
MFC Mykolaiv players
FC Continentals players
Canadian Soccer League (1998–present) players
Association football forwards
Ukrainian First League players
Ukrainian expatriate footballers
Ukrainian expatriate sportspeople in Canada
Expatriate soccer players in Canada
Ukrainian Second League players